Peromyscopsylla is a genus of fleas belonging to the family Leptopsyllidae.

The species of this genus are found in Europe and Northern America.

Species:
 Peromyscopsylla bidentata (Kolenati, 1863) 
 Peromyscopsylla catatina Jordan, 1928

References

Fleas
Siphonaptera genera